Nationality words link to articles with information on the nation's poetry or literature (for instance, Irish or France).

Events
 April 27 – The blind, impoverished, 58-year-old John Milton seals a contract for publication of his epic poem Paradise Lost with London printer Samuel Simmons for an initial payment of £5. The first edition is published in October in 10 books and sells out in eighteen months (second edition, in 12 books, published 1674).

Works published
 Nicholas Billingsley, Thesauro-Phulakion; or, A Treasury of Divine Raptures
 Charles Cotton, Scarronides; or, Virgile Travestie published anonymously (see also Scarronides 1665, 1665)
 Jeremias de Dekker (died 1666), Lof der Geldzucht ("In praise of avarice" - satire), Dutch
 Sir John Denham, On Mr Abraham Cowley His Death, and Burial Amongst the Ancient Poets
 John Dryden, Annus Mirabilis; The Year of Wonders, 1666
 John Milton, Paradise Lost
 Katherine Philips, Poems: By the most deservedly admired Mrs Katherine Philips the Matchless Orinda, published posthumously

Births
Death years link to the corresponding "[year] in poetry" article:
 November 30 – Jonathan Swift (died 1745), Irish cleric, satirist, essayist, political pamphleteer, and poet
 John Pomfret (died 1702), English poet and clergyman
 Wali Mohammed Wali, also known as Wali Deccani and Wali Aurangabadi (died 1707), Indian, Urdu-language poet
 Ned Ward (died 1731), English satirical writer and publican

Deaths
Birth years link to the corresponding "[year] in poetry" article:
 May 2 (O.S.) – George Wither (born 1588), English poet and satirist
 May 14 – Georges de Scudéry (born 1601), French novelist, dramatist and poet; elder brother of Madeleine de Scudéry
 July 12 (bur.) – Jan Vos (born 1612), Dutch playwright and poet
 July 28 – Abraham Cowley (born 1618), English poet
 August 31 – Johann von Rist (born 1607), German poet, hymnodist and dramatist

See also

 Poetry
 17th century in poetry
 17th century in literature
 Restoration literature

Notes

17th-century poetry
Poetry